Fung Wan or Feng Yun is a Hong Kong wuxia manhua series. It is the first manhua released by Ma Wing-shing in 1989 with the help of his assistant Siu Kit under his own company, Jonesky Publishing. Before the third part, the manhua was originally titled Fung Wan, until the two protagonists – Wind and Cloud – became secondary characters and the manhua was renamed Tin Ha. The story has been adapted into media, most notably the Hong Kong films The Storm Riders (1998) and The Storm Warriors (2009), the video game Fung Wan Online, and the Taiwanese television series Wind and Cloud (2002) and Wind and Cloud II (2004).

Plot 
The story is set in the jianghu (martial artists' community) of China during the Ming dynasty. The two protagonists – Nie Feng (Wind) and Bu Jingyun (Cloud) – learn martial arts in their early years and grow up to become legendary figures in the jianghu. As the story progresses, more characters are introduced in new story arcs.

Part 1 
The first story arc is about the origins of Wind and Cloud. When they were still boys, they were accepted into the martial arts clan Tianxiahui (Under Heaven Society) by its chief, Xiongba (Lord Conqueror), who trained them in martial arts for an ulterior motive. Conqueror was once told by a Buddhist prophet that he would rise to power in the jianghu with the help of "Wind and Cloud". When Conqueror reaches the pinnacle of his conquests, the prophet reveals that "Wind and Cloud" are also destined to bring about Conqueror's downfall, so Conqueror plots to turn Wind and Cloud against each other. The rest of the story arc follows the adventures of Wind and Cloud after they escape from Tianxiahui. They gradually improve their skills, acquire powerful weapons, befriend other notable jianghu figures, and meet their respective lovers. Wind and Cloud eventually return to confront Conqueror and defeat him, thus fulfilling the prophecy. After that, Wind and Cloud decide to retire from the jianghu to lead reclusive lives with their respective lovers.

Juewushen (Lord Godless), a formidable Japanese fighter, leads his clan to China with the intention of dominating the jianghu and ruling China. He captures the Chinese emperor and sends his son, Juexin (Heartless), to impersonate the emperor and then pretend to pass the throne to him. Wind and Cloud come out of retirement and collaborate with their jianghu allies to stop Godless. After his defeat, Godless takes the Chinese emperor and other jianghu figures hostage and retreats back to Japan. Wind and Cloud travel to Japan, where they meet Tennō, a Japanese warlord, and join forces with him to counter Godless. Godless is eventually betrayed and killed by Heartless, who has switched allegiance to Tennō. After returning to China, Wind and Cloud realise that Tennō is secretly plotting to seize the Dragon Bones, the spiritual foundation of the Chinese empire. Wind learns a new but dangerous skill to counter the invaders, and falls into a demonic trance as a result. Even though they manage to defeat Tennō and the Dragon Bones get destroyed in the process, the demon-possessed Wind now poses a serious threat to the jianghu. In the final showdown, Cloud confronts Wind and manages to knock him out of his trance, but falls off a cliff during the fight and goes missing.

Part 2 
Huaikong, a member of the Iron School, goes on a quest to search for the missing Cloud. He manages to find Cloud, who has lost his memory and become a fisherman, and gradually help him regain his memory and return to the jianghu. Wind also returns to the jianghu and reunites with Cloud. Around this time, a mysterious martial arts clan, Tianmen (Heaven School), has emerged in the jianghu and attracted many top fighters to join them. The clan's leader, Dishitian, is actually Xu Fu, who has become immortal and spent the past centuries mastering all kinds of martial arts, thus making himself nearly invincible. He has a grand plan to gather the seven fighters who possess the seven most powerful weapons in the jianghu to join him in his quest to slay a dragon and obtain the Dragon Orb, which can boost their inner energy by several times when consumed. The quest is successful but the orb breaks into seven pieces. Out of greed, Dishitian consumes more pieces than his body can take, and suffers serious internal injuries. His treacherous servant, Duan Lang, seizes the opportunity to kill him and absorb his powers. Duan Lang becomes the new threat to the jianghu and he kills Wind and Cloud's loved ones. Although Wind and Cloud manage to destroy Duan Lang, they end up being frozen in ice and are never seen again in the jianghu for many years.

Part 3 
Many years have passed since Wind and Cloud's battle against Duan Lang. Order and stability have been restored in the jianghu while a new generation of characters make their debut. These new characters include Wind and Cloud's respective sons, Yifeng and Bu Tian, as well as Duan Lang's twin sons, Shenfeng and Lanwu. In the meantime, Wind and Cloud are saved from being frozen in ice, and they return to the jianghu, where they face an old foe, Juexin (Heartless), as well as other enemies.

Publication
The English version of the manhua was published by the now-defunct ComicsOne.
Storm Riders Vol.01:  
Storm Riders Vol.02:  
Storm Riders Vol.03:  
Storm Riders Vol.04:  
Storm Riders Vol.05:  
Storm Riders Vol.06:  
Storm Riders Vol.07:  
Storm Riders Vol.08:  
Storm Riders Vol.09:  
Storm Riders Vol.10:  
Storm Riders Vol.11:  
Storm Riders Vol.12:  
Storm Riders II: Invading Sun Vol.1:  
Storm Riders II: Invading Sun Vol.2:  
Storm Riders II: Invading Sun Vol.3:  
Storm Riders II: Invading Sun Vol.4:  
Storm Riders II: Invading Sun Vol.5:  
Storm Riders II: Invading Sun Vol.6:

Spin-offs
There is a spin-off of Fung Wan called Shenwuji, which involves the descendants of Wind and Cloud. It is also written by Ma Wing-shing and has met with mixed reviews.

Adaptations

Film
 The Storm Riders is a 1998 Hong Kong film starring Ekin Cheng as Wind and Aaron Kwok as Cloud.
 The Storm Warriors is a 2009 sequel to The Storm Riders. Ekin Cheng and Aaron Kwok reprise their roles as Wind and Cloud respectively.
 Storm Rider Clash of the Evils is a 2008 animated feature film by Puzzle Animation Studio Limited. A five-minute animated clip was released.

Television
 Wind and Cloud is a 2002 television series starring Peter Ho as Cloud and Vincent Zhao as Wind.
 Wind and Cloud 2 is a 2004 sequel to Wind and Cloud. Peter Ho and Vincent Zhao reprise their roles as Cloud and Wind respectively.

Video games
 Fung Wan Reborn is a MMORPG based on the series.

Postage Stamps
 Hong Kong Post issued a set of six stamps and two stamp sheetlets on October 29, 2020

See also
 Ma Wing-shing
 Chinese Hero

References

External links
Comicsworld - Official Site of Ma Wing-shing
Storm Riders at SPCNET - Fansite
sk Collections Fung Wan merchandise - Fansite

 
Manhua titles
Wuxia comics
1989 comics debuts
Comics set in the Ming dynasty
Manhua adapted into films